Coming Back for More is a documentary about Sly Stone, lead singer of Sly and the Family Stone. It was directed by Willem Alkema.

Background
Coming Back for More, also known as Dance to the Music is a documentary about Sly Stone, his absence from the music scene, and a quest to find out what happened to the artist. This is the first documentary Sly Stone has collaborated on since the 80s. The film features the first filmed interviews with the reclusive artist since his last TV appearance at Late Night With David Letterman: February 21, 1983.

Coming Back for More is the second documentary about Stone, Dutch director Willem Alkema had made. The film looks at the hardships endured by Stone and alleges that this problem was caused by former manager Jerry Goldstein. The film features interviews with Stone's family members and former bandmates and concludes with an interview between the filmmaker and Stone himself.

Prior to this film, Alkema had made a documentary Dance to the Music which was also about Stone. It was released in 2008. In 2010 the film won the audience award at Biografilm Festival in Bologna Italy.The latest version is from 2015, the film was updated for release in Japan. This version features Sly's final public appearance in a tribute with fans during Love City: A Convention Celebrating Sly & the Family Stone on January 24, 2015 in Oakland.

Story 
Director Willem Alkema starts searching in 2002 for Sly Stone who has lived for years as a hermit and is rarely seen. In 2006, during the rehearsals for the Grammy Awards, a first meeting takes place. Alkema is accompanied by the Dutch twin biographers Arno and Edwin Konings. Sly Stone's sister: Vaetta Stewart gives a series of performances in Europe where Sly performs a number of songs.

This is where the documentary Dance to the Music ends.

In Coming Back for More the story continues. Alkema speaks to Sly in hotel rooms. In the film, Sly tells about his relationship with Jimi Hendrix, the origin of his songs, the writing process and his connection with Doris Day and Charles Manson. In the film, Sly plays new songs. According to the documentary, Sly is forced to live in a motor home because of a royal conflict with his manager Jerry Goldstein. Thanks to Arno and Edwin Konings, Alkema is in possession of an agreement from the past, which contributes to the lawsuit that Sly is conducting against his manager.

The film ends during :Love City: A Convention Celebrating Sly & The Family Stone on January 24, 2015 in Oakland.

In an interview with the San Francisco Bay View, Alkema said that this project had changed his view on the barriers between black and white as he was quite naïve in thinking they didn't exist.

Premiere 
The film premiered at the Hot Springs Documentary Film Festival on Friday 16th October 2009.

Cast
 Frank Arellano
 George Clinton
 Greg Errico
 Jerry Martini
 Nile Rodgers
 Sly Stone
Cynthia Robinson
Larry Graham
Stephen Paley
Clive Davis
Pat Rizzo
Novena Carmel
Phunne Robinson
Peter D. Coogan

References

External links
 Film Festivals Coming Back for More
https://www.mymovies.it/dizionario/recensione.asp?id=62875
Official website

Films about Sly Stone
Sly and the Family Stone
Documentary films about music and musicians